Alexander Junior Grant (born 27 August 1983), professionally known as Alex da Kid or by.ALEXANDER, is a British musician, record producer, songwriter, record executive and fashion designer from Wood Green, London.  He has gained recognition for producing several hit singles for artists of multiple music genres (mostly hip hop and alternative rock), such as Dr. Dre ("I Need a Doctor"), Nicki Minaj ("Massive Attack"), B.o.B ("Airplanes" featuring Hayley Williams), Eminem ("Love the Way You Lie" featuring Rihanna), Diddy ("Coming Home" with Dirty Money featuring Skylar Grey), Imagine Dragons ("Radioactive") and Cheryl ("Under The Sun").

Although he now lives in Los Angeles, the Evening Standard named him one of "London's Most Influential People in 2011." He has been nominated for numerous Grammy Awards including "Album of the Year" for his work on Rihanna's Loud. His record label, KIDinaKORNER, is a subdivision of Interscope Records. In both 2013 and 2014, Grant (as owner of KIDinaKORNER Records) was chosen by Billboard Magazine for their "Top 40 Under 40." In 2020, Grant released a jazz album titled 000 CHANNEL BLACK, under the pseudonym by.ALEXANDER.

Early life
Alexander Junior Grant was born 27 August 1983 in North London, to a Jamaican father and an English mother. Grant was a professional footballer, playing for Bristol City until 19 years of age, at which time a friend introduced him to the digital music editing software FruityLoops, prompting an interest in music production. He then attended University of West London (UWL) to study towards a master's degree in Audio Technology, now called Advanced Music Technology.

Musical career

Universal Music Publishing Group's Jessica Rivera first heard about Grant in 2009 though Grant's lawyer Scott Felcher. On request, Grant sent Rivera some of his music, and the publishing executive later related her reactions to HitQuarters: "It hit me right away that this dude had something different to bring to the table ... He wasn't just straight up hip-hop – his sound was very different and transcended genres."

In 2016, Grant released his first solo project as an artist. The single, "Not Easy" features X Ambassadors, Elle King and Wiz Khalifa via KIDinaKORNER/RCA Records. The track was written and produced by Alex da Kid for KIDinaKORNER, Sam Harris, Casey Harris, Adam Levin, Elle King, and Wiz Khalifa. In 2017, Grant released his second track, "American Funeral" which was a co-written collaboration with Joseph Angel.

In a Music Connection magazine cover story from January 2015, Grant said, as a producer, he co-writes everything that he works on with the artists.

On 27 August 2020, Grant released his first full-length project, a jazz album titled 000 CHANNEL BLACK, under the moniker by.ALEXANDER. The album features guest appearances from 070 Shake, Tanerélle, Charles Bukowski, Michèle Lamy, Rainsford and Irina Shayk.

Other ventures

KIDinaKORNER

In 2011, Grant launched his record label, KIDinaKORNER.

_by.ALEXANDER
In 2020, Grant founded _by.ALEXANDER, his own luxury fashion label. His debut collection, called “000 CHANNEL BLACK,” features a mix of one-off pieces and elevated sportswear styles. Actor Gary Busey and model Irina Shayk star in the first editorial campaign, kicking off the launch. Designed and developed in Los Angeles by Grant himself, the unisex 19-piece collection is full of contrasting details and juxtapositions.

Discography

Studio albums

Singles

Production discography

Singles produced

References

1982 births
British hip hop record producers
Living people
Musicians from London
Alumni of University College London
Alumni of the University of West London
English record producers
English hip hop musicians
English pop musicians
Black British musicians
People from Wood Green 
Footballers from Wood Green
Musicians from Bristol
Bristol City F.C. players
Association footballers not categorized by position
English footballers
English people of Jamaican descent
Fashion designers from London